Aroma is an unincorporated community in White River Township, Hamilton County, Indiana.

History
Aroma was named in the 19th century by William P. Haworth, who kept a small store there.  Aroma was a descriptive name, perhaps for the scent of fresh-cut hay. A post office was established at Aroma in 1870, and remained in operation until it was discontinued in 1902.

Geography

References

Unincorporated communities in Hamilton County, Indiana
Unincorporated communities in Indiana
Indianapolis metropolitan area